Hearts in Mind is an album by folk-country singer Nanci Griffith, which was released in Ireland and the United Kingdom on October 11, 2004. It was later released in the USA on February 1, 2005 featuring the bonus track "Our Very Own".. As with Griffith's 2001 album Clock Without Hands, Vietnam is a recurring theme ("Old Hanoi", "Heart of Indochine").

Track listing 
All tracks composed by Nanci Griffith; except where indicated.

"Simple Life"  (Griffith, Elizabeth Cook) 3:06
"Angels"   (Tom Kimmel, Jennifer Kimball) 4:34
"Heart of Indochine"  3:48 
"Beautiful"  4:10 
"Back When Ted Loved Sylvia"   (LeAnn Etheridge) 4:15  
"Mountain of Sorrow"   (Julie Gold) 3:50  
"Old Hanoi"  3:39 
"Before"   (Griffith, LeAnn Etheridge) 2:43
"I Love This Town" featuring Jimmy Buffett on backing vocals  (Clive Gregson) 3:21  
"Rise to the Occasion"   (Ron Davies) 3:18  
"Love Conquers All"   (Griffith, Charley Stefl) 2:50 
"Last Train Home"  3:06
"Big Blue Ball of War"  4:05 
"Our Very Own"   (Griffith, Keith Carradine) *(US Release Only) 4:15

Personnel 
 Nanci Griffith - vocals, acoustic guitar
 John Catchings - cello
 Lloyd Green - dobro
 Doug Lancio - guitar
 Jennifer Kimball - background vocals
 Cathryn Craig - background vocals

The Blue Moon Orchestra
 LeAnn Etheridge - acoustic guitar, bass guitar, harmony vocals
 Clive Gregson - acoustic and electric guitar, dobro, mandolin, accordion
 Ron de la Vega - bass guitar 
 James Hooker - piano, organ, synthesizer
 Pat McInerney - drums, percussion

External links 
 Barry A. Jeckell:  Vietnam War Still Fresh In Griffith's 'Mind' , billboard.com, February 21, 2005 (archived)

References 

Nanci Griffith albums
2004 albums